Jeneen Frei Njootli is an interdisciplinary Vuntut Gwitchin artist known primarily for their work with sound and textiles, performance, fashion, workshops, and barbeques.

Work 
Njootli is a co-creator of the ReMatriate Collective, a group working toward better representation of Indigenous women in the media. 

As one of the five finalist of the 2018 Sobey Art Award, Njoottli's work, wind sucked in through bared teeth (2017) is included in an eponymous exhibition featuring the finalists at the National Gallery of Canada.

In 2016, Njootli completed the Media Arts Residency at the Western Front, an artist-run centre in Vancouver.

Njootli has worked on several projects and presentations with artist Olivia Whetung. Whetung wrote Fugitive Dust to accompany Njootli’s solo exhibition I Can’t Make You Those Mitts Because There Is a Hole in My Heart and My Hands Hurt (2018).

Education 
In 2017, Njootli earned an M.F.A from the University of British Columbia. In 2016, Njootli completed the Earth Line Indigenous Tattoo training residency.

Performance 

2018
 Sound tools, Mercer Union, Toronto ON

2016
 Ishi: The Archive Performance with James Luna, la Jolla Playhouse, San Diego CA
 The language your tongue might find could be haunting, Sled Island Music Festival, Calgary AB 
 Melanocite, aceart, Winnipeg MB 

2015
 La Pocha Nostra, Live Biennale with La Pocha Nostra at VIVO, Vancouver BC 
 Native Stories: Sounds, Stories & Shadows with James Luna, Live Biennale at VIVO, Vancouver BC 
 She Showed Me What I Had Done, or What I Had Been Doing, Macaulay Co. & Fine Art, Vancouver BC 
 Artist Talk and Performance at Audain Gallery, Super Cool Tuesdays, Vancouver BC 

2014
 Performer: Claiming Space Exhibition Opening, Museum of Anthropology, Vancouver BC

Awards and honours 
In 2018, Njootli was the Sobey Art Award Finalist for the West Coast and Yukon categories. In 2017, Njootli was also longlisted for the Sobey Art Award for the West Coast and Yukon categories, and in the same year, awarded the Contemporary Art Society of Vancouver's Artist Prize. In 2016, Njootli was awarded the Hnatyshyn Foundation, William & Meredith Saunderson Prize for Emerging Canadian Artist Lectures, Workshops & Curating.

See also 

 Jim Robb (painter)
 Joseph Tisiga
 Ted Harrison

References 
  

Living people
21st-century First Nations people
Canadian sound artists
Women sound artists
Canadian textile artists
Canadian women artists
Emily Carr University of Art and Design alumni
First Nations artists
First Nations women
Vuntut Gwitchin people
Women textile artists
Year of birth missing (living people)
First Nations women artists